Žarko Šešum (born 16 June 1986) is a retired Serbian handball player.

Club career
Born in Bačka Palanka, Šešum started out at his hometown club Sintelon. He was promoted to the senior squad in the 2002–03 season, at age 16. In early 2007, Šešum was transferred to Hungary and signed with MKB Veszprém. He helped the side win three consecutive championships. In 2010, Šešum moved to Germany and joined Rhein-Neckar Löwen, spending the next four years with the club. He subsequently played for fellow German team Frisch Auf Göppingen from 2014 to 2018, winning two successive EHF Cup titles (2016 and 2017).

International career

Youth
At youth level, Šešum was an instrumental member of the Serbia and Montenegro winning squad at the European Under-18 Championship in August 2004. He subsequently led his nation to the gold medal at the World Under-19 Championship in August 2005. Later the same month, Šešum was an important member of the team that finished as runners-up at the World Under-21 Championship.

Senior
A Serbia international since its inception, Šešum made his major debut for the national team at the 2009 World Championship. He was also a member of the squad that won the silver medal at the 2012 European Championship, but missed the final due to injury. Subsequently, Šešum was selected to compete at the 2012 Summer Olympics.

Honours
MKB Veszprém
 Nemzeti Bajnokság I: 2007–08, 2008–09, 2009–10
 Magyar Kupa: 2006–07, 2008–09, 2009–10
 EHF Cup Winners' Cup: 2007–08
Rhein-Neckar Löwen
 EHF Cup: 2012–13
Frisch Auf Göppingen
 EHF Cup: 2015–16, 2016–17
Kadetten Schaffhausen
 Swiss Handball League: 2018–19

References

External links

 EHF record
 MKSZ record
 Olympic record

1986 births
Living people
People from Bačka Palanka
Serbian male handball players
Competitors at the 2009 Mediterranean Games
Mediterranean Games medalists in handball
Mediterranean Games gold medalists for Serbia
Olympic handball players of Serbia
Handball players at the 2012 Summer Olympics
RK Sintelon players
Veszprém KC players
Rhein-Neckar Löwen players
Frisch Auf Göppingen players
Handball-Bundesliga players
Expatriate handball players
Serbian expatriate sportspeople in Hungary
Serbian expatriate sportspeople in Germany
Serbian expatriate sportspeople in Switzerland